Patrick Grassley (born May 26, 1983) is the Iowa State Representative from the 57th District. A Republican, Grassley has served in the Iowa House of Representatives since 2007. He also serves as speaker of the Iowa House of Representatives. Grassley is the grandson of U.S. Senator Chuck Grassley.

Iowa House of Representatives

Elections 
In 2006, Grassley ran for a seat in the Iowa House of Representatives. He defeated Alek Wipperman, 57%-43%. In 2008, Grassley won re-election to a second term, defeating Democrat Cayla Baresel, 66%-34%. In 2010, he won re-election to a third term unopposed.

After redistricting, he decided to run in the newly redrawn 50th house district, which included a southern portion of Butler County, a northern portion of Hardin County, and all of Grundy County. Fellow Republican State Representative Annette Sweeney also decided to run in the newly redrawn 50th district. Grassley defeated Sweeney 61%-39%, and won a fourth term in the general election unopposed. Grassley was re-elected in 2014, 2016, 2018, and 2020.

Tenure 
In January 2020, Grassley was elected as Speaker of the Iowa House of Representatives. He previously chaired the budget writing committee in the Iowa House of Representatives.

Political future 
In 2014, there was speculation that Grassley was being groomed to succeed his grandfather, U.S. Senator Chuck Grassley, upon his retirement. In 2013, however, Chuck Grassley said, "[Pat] and I have never had that discussion and he's never told me that he wanted to run for the United States Senate."

Electoral history

Personal life 
Grassley was born in Cedar Falls, Iowa. He was raised in New Hartford, Iowa. His father Robin is a farmer, and his mother Diane is a T.A. in the Dike-New Hartford School District in Dike, Grundy County, Iowa. Grassley has two younger sisters. He is the grandson of U.S. Senator Chuck Grassley.

Grassley graduated from Dike-New Hartford High School in 2002 and received an associate of arts degree in agribusiness from Hawkeye Community College in 2004. He has taken courses toward a bachelor's degree at the University of Northern Iowa, where he unsuccessfully ran for student body president.

Grassley farms the family farm with his father and grandfather. He is a member of the Farm Bureau.

Grassley and his wife Amanda married in 2005. According to court records, they were divorced in 2022. The Grassleys are the parents of two daughters and a son.

References

External links 
 Representative Pat Grassley official Iowa General Assembly site
 

|-

|-

1983 births
21st-century American politicians
Living people
People from Butler County, Iowa
People from Cedar Falls, Iowa
Place of birth missing (living people)
Speakers of the Iowa House of Representatives
Republican Party members of the Iowa House of Representatives